Prisoner 382 - the fate of a Persian spy is a German biographical documentary film which was shown on BBC Persian Television on 8 May 2015.

The film was directed by DDT, a German independent film documentary company and portrays the life of the Iranian Hossein Yazdi.

Description
In 1954, the young Iranian Hossein Yazdi moved from Tehran to East Berlin to begin his studies in agricultural economics in the German Democratic Republic (GDR). Soon, he was confronted with the socialistic system in the GDR and decided to gather information about the Iranian communists living in the GDR. While he was trying to deliver this information to the secret service in West Berlin, he was arrested at Checkpoint Charlie on 26 October 1961, and isolated in solitary confinement in Bautzen II, a secret prison run by the Stasi, the Ministry for State Security in the GDR.

Despite intense efforts of the International Society for Human Rights and his parents living in Tehran, it took over 15 years, until the Shah Mohammad Reza Pahlavi could arrange his release in 1978.

Production
The documentary was shot in Germany and the United States in 2001 and 2003 and was produced by German journalist Ralf Gründer. Together with Chandra Fleig, he directed the film, with whom he founded the independent film documentary company DDT, based in Berlin.

External links
 BBC Prisoner 382 - the fate of a Persian spy  at BBC Persian Television
 

2003 films
German biographical films
German documentary films
2000s German-language films
Biographical documentary films
Films shot in Germany
2000s English-language films
2000s German films